Green Monday is an online retail industry term similar to Cyber Monday. The term was coined by Shopping.com, an eBay company, in 2007 to describe the best eCommerce sales day in December, usually the second Monday of December. After doing some internal research, they realized that the second Monday in December was the last day that shoppers were able to place an online order that would arrive in time for the holidays. Green Monday is defined more specifically by business research organization comScore as the last Monday with at least 10 days prior to Christmas.

In 2009, $854 million was spent online in the US on Green Monday, with sales in 2011 reaching $1.133 billion. In 2012, Green Monday topped out at $1.27 billion, up 13% from 2011 and the third heaviest online sales day for the season behind Cyber Monday and Dec. 4, 2012 (which had no marketing tie-in), according to comScore.

See also
Green Friday
Black Friday (shopping)
Buy Nothing Day
Small Business Saturday
Super Saturday (Panic Saturday)
Cyber Monday
Giving Tuesday

References 

Business terms
E-commerce in the United States
Monday observances
December observances
Holidays and observances by scheduling (nth weekday of the month)